Bataillonsführer (battalion leader) is a German paramilitary title that has existed since the First World War.  Originally, the title of Bataillonsführer was held by the officer commanding an infantry battalion (most often a Major).  After the close of World War I, the title became one of several paramilitary ranks in the Freikorps.

The last usage of Bataillonsführer, as a paramilitary title, was in 1945 when the position was held by battalion commanders of Volkssturm units.

References

Nazi paramilitary ranks
Wehrmacht